= Electronic Information Storage =

Electronic Information Storage may refer to:

- Computer data storage, computer components and recording media that retain digital data
- Data storage device, a device for recording (storing) information (data)
